Zsuzsa Jánosi (born 19 November 1963) is a Hungarian fencer, who won a bronze medal in the team foil competition at the 1988 Summer Olympics, in Seoul together with Zsuzsanna Szőcs, Katalin Tuschák, Edit Kovács and Gertrúd Stefanek.

References

External links
 Munzinger.de 

1963 births
Living people
Hungarian female foil fencers
Fencers at the 1988 Summer Olympics
Fencers at the 1992 Summer Olympics
Fencers at the 1996 Summer Olympics
Olympic fencers of Hungary
Olympic bronze medalists for Hungary
Olympic medalists in fencing
Fencers from Budapest
Medalists at the 1988 Summer Olympics
Universiade medalists in fencing
Universiade silver medalists for Hungary
Medalists at the 1989 Summer Universiade
20th-century Hungarian women